Jason Reeves may refer to:

Jason Reeves (radio broadcaster) (born 1976), New Zealand radio personality
Jason Reeves (songwriter) (born 1984), American folk songwriter